Hamilton Township is a rural township located in Northumberland County in central Ontario. It surrounds the Town of Cobourg.

The township was named after Henry Hamilton, Lieutenant-Governor of Quebec from 1782 to 1785.

Communities
Baltimore
Bewdley
Camborne
Cold Springs
Gores Landing
Harwood
Plainville 
Precious Corners 

Demographics 

Mother tongue:
English as first language: 94.2%
French as first language: 1.0%
English and French as first language: 0.1%
Other as first language: 4.7%

Gallery

See also
List of townships in Ontario

References

External links

Township municipalities in Ontario
Lower-tier municipalities in Ontario
Municipalities in Northumberland County, Ontario